Kalakan , is a village located in the center of Kalakan District, Kabul Province, Afghanistan.

See also 
Kalakan District
Kabul Province

References 

Populated places in Kabul Province